Jack and Jill: A Village Story by Louisa May Alcott, is a children's book originally published in 1880.  It takes place in a small New England town after the Civil War. The story of two good friends named Jack and Janey, Jack and Jill tells of the aftermath of a serious sledding accident.

Plot
Jack Minot and Janey Pecq are best friends who live next door to each other.  They are always seen together, so Janey gets the nickname of Jill, to mimic the old rhyme.  The two do go up a hill one winter day— and then suffer a terrible accident. Seriously injured in a sledding accident, they recover from their physical injuries, while learning life lessons along with their many friends. They are helped along their journey to recovery by various activities created by their mothers. In the end they are all the better for it and have learned many valuable lessons.

Sources

External links
 
 
Literature Network
Daily Lit 

1880 American novels
American children's novels
Novels by Louisa May Alcott
1880s children's books